Jogo Duplo (English: Double Game) was Portuguese telenovela broadcast and produced by TVI. It was written by Artur Ribeiro. The telenovela premiered on December 4, 2017 and ended on November 18, 2018. It is recorded between Portugal (Setúbal and Alcácer do Sal), China (Macau) and Asia (Vietnam).

Plot 
The story of João and Margarida happens between Macao and Portugal. The young lovers were separated when they were teenagers and they find each other in Macao after many years. João has changed his life and he is now a rich mafia casino boss that, after the encounter with Margarida, decides to return to Portugal to reconquer her. Once at his native land, João finds himself in the midst of an ancestral setting in a region that is experiencing a conflict between urbanity, rurality and luxury tourism of the coast where the cohabitation is not always peaceful. However, all these conflicts will be eclipsed by a greater threat when Manuel Qiang, João's former boss in Macao, after losing the war with a rival triad, returns to Portugal determined to conquer a new business empire using unscrupulous illegal methods.

Cast
 João Catarré - João Guerra (Protagonist)
 Sara Prata - Margarida Barbosa (Protagonist)
 Diogo Infante - Manuel Qiang (Antagonist)
 Fernanda Serrano - Maria João Barbosa (Protagonist)
 Afonso Pimentel - Rodrigo Sousa
 Alba Baptista - Leonor Neves
 Ana Lopes Gomes - Sónia Mateus
 Ana Varela - Diana Barbosa
 Anna Eremin - Cátia Sobral (Susanna's love interest)
 António Melo - Francisco «Ti Chico»
 Bárbara Branco - Sandra Duque
 Diana Costa e Silva - Laura Barbosa Guerreiro
 Duarte Gomes - Diogo Guerra
 Fernando Pires - Miguel Cássio
 Filipe Matos - Fernando Alves «Freddy»
 Graciano Dias - Tiago Venâncio
 Jani Zhao - Susana Wang
 João Brás - Joaquim Sequeira
 João de Brito - Sérgio Sarabando
 João Lagarto - Teodoro Guerra
 Liliana Brandão - Sílvia Cunha
 Luís Esparteiro - Vítor Duque
 Luís Ganito - Renato Nunes
 Luís Nascimento - Zhu
 Manuela Couto - Clara Neves
 Maria Emília Correia - Rosa Trindade
 Maria Hasse - Patrícia Dias
 Nuno Homem de Sá - Afonso Barbosa
 Paula Neves - Marta Monteiro
 Pompeu José - Telmo Carrapatoso
 Rodrigo Tomás - Alexandre Guerra
 Rui Mendes - Padre Sousa 
 Sabri Lucas - Óscar Mourão
 Sandra Faleiro - Amália Reis
 Sandra Santos - Emília Venâncio
 Sara Barradas - Gabriela Nunes
 Sérgio Praia - Luís Humberto
 Sofia Arruda - Teresa Santos
 Sofia Grillo - Helena Duque
 Tiago Felizardo - Rafael Borges
 Vitor D’Andrade - Tomás Vaz Melo

References

External links

2017 telenovelas
Portuguese telenovelas
2017 Portuguese television series debuts
2018 Portuguese television series endings
Televisão Independente telenovelas
Portuguese-language telenovelas
Lesbian-related television shows
2010s LGBT-related television series